Kimo may refer to:
 Kimo, a village in Oravais, Finland
 KiMo Theater, Albuquerque, USA
 Chery A1, a car, also known as "Kimo" in Russia
 KYUR, television station based in Anchorage, Alaska known as KIMO from 1971 until 2010
 Kimo Yeti (born c. 1935), Huaorani tribesman of Ecuador
 Kimo, a common Hawaiian name translated to "Jim" or "James", see Hawaiian name
 Kimo Armitage, American poet, children's book author, playwright and videographer

Music
 Kimo (band), New Zealand music group
 Kimo Proudfoot, American director of music videos
 Kimo Wilder McVay (1927–2001), musician turned talent manager
 Kimo Williams, American musician

Sports
 Matt Anoa'i, professional wrestler who worked under the name Kimo
 Kimo Leopoldo (born 1968), mixed martial artist often billed as just Kimo
 Kimo Sampson (born 1994), Grenadian footballer
 Kimo von Oelhoffen (born 1971), American football player